The Tamil Nesan was a Tamil language newspaper published in Malaysia. Established in 1924, it was the oldest running Tamil newspaper in the country until its disestablishment in 2019.

First issued on 24 September 1924, the Tamil Nesan was a paper catering to the ethnic Indian community in Malaysia, primarily Tamilians, serving its readers with a variety of political, religious, nation, world, educational and Tamil cinema news. It was published daily and approximately 20,000 copies were sold every day. Like the Makkal Osai, the paper was affiliated with the Malaysian Indian Congress through its ownership by the family of former MIC president Samy Vellu.

The paper ceased publication on 1 February 2019, citing 10 years of financial difficulties.

References

External links 
 Newspaper web page ("under construction" as of Jan 2008)

Newspapers published in Malaysia
Tamil-language newspapers
Newspapers established in 1924
Publications disestablished in 2019
1924 establishments in British Malaya
2019 disestablishments in Malaysia